Oiva Onni Rantasalo (28 April 1883, Eura – 14 October 1977; surname until 1906 Björni) was a Finnish landowner and politician. He was a Member of the Parliament of Finland, representing the Finnish Party from 1917 to 1918 and the National Coalition Party from 1918 to 1919.

References

1883 births
1977 deaths
People from Eura
People from Turku and Pori Province (Grand Duchy of Finland)
Finnish Party politicians
National Coalition Party politicians
Members of the Parliament of Finland (1917–19)
Place of death missing